Ozan Özkan (born 1 June 1984) is a Turkish former footballer.

References

1984 births
Sportspeople from Muğla
Living people
Turkish footballers
Association football defenders
Muğlaspor footballers
Konyaspor footballers
Karşıyaka S.K. footballers
Denizlispor footballers
Mersin İdman Yurdu footballers
Bandırmaspor footballers
Samsunspor footballers
Süper Lig players
TFF First League players
TFF Second League players
TFF Third League players